The Little Sandy River is a tributary of the Ohio River in northeastern Kentucky in the United States. Via the Ohio, it is part of the Mississippi River watershed.

Course
The Little Sandy rises in southern Elliott County and flows generally north-northeastwardly in a meandering course through Elliott, Carter and Greenup counties, through the towns of Sandy Hook and Grayson.  It joins the Ohio River at Greenup.

Dams
A U.S. Army Corps of Engineers dam in Carter County causes the river to widen as Grayson Lake in southern Carter and northern Elliott Counties.  Grayson Lake State Park is located along this impoundment.

East Fork Little Sandy River
It rises in northern Lawrence County and initially flows eastwardly before turning north-northwestwardly through Boyd and Greenup Counties. It flows past the Ashland suburb of Cannonsburg.

See also
Big Sandy River
List of Kentucky rivers

References

Columbia Gazetteer of North America entry

External links
Grayson Lake website

Rivers of Kentucky
Tributaries of the Ohio River
Rivers of Carter County, Kentucky
Rivers of Elliott County, Kentucky
Rivers of Greenup County, Kentucky
Rivers of Lawrence County, Kentucky
Rivers of Boyd County, Kentucky